The Golden Wind is a historical novel by American writer L. Sprague de Camp, first published in hardcover by Doubleday in 1969, and in paperback by Curtis in 1972. The book was reissued with a new introduction by Harry Turtledove as a trade paperback and e-book by Phoenix Pick in July 2014. It is the fifth and last of de Camp's historical novels, both in order of writing and chronologically. The novel has also been translated into German.

The same title was used for a story of adventure in China by Takashi Ohta and Margaret Sperry, first published in 1929.

Plot summary
The novel concerns the adventures of Eudoxus of Cyzicus and Hippalus on the first voyages by sea from Egypt to India. Following these, it deals with Eudoxus' efforts to circumvent the newly established Egyptian monopoly on trade with India by pioneering a new route around the west coast of Africa, which are ultimately defeated by misadventure and the sheer extent of the continent.

Reception
Publishers Weekly calls the book "a tale of high adventure, rich in historical lore and erudite in the telling. Of Mr. de Camp's … novels, this may well be the most ambitious and quite possibly the best." In contrast, Carol Ann Shine, writing for Library Journal, feels "Mr. de Camp has completely missed the mark in this story," which "moves slowly through stereotyped situations which would tax the imagination of the most gullible reader, and obvious and seemingly inappropriate philosophical discussions further delay the action." She rates it "for the faithful L. S. de Camp follower only … however, this title will disappoint even Mr. de Camp's large following."

Notes

1969 American novels
Historical novels
Novels by L. Sprague de Camp
Doubleday (publisher) books
Novels set in the 2nd century BC